Bridge 9 Records is an American hardcore punk record label located outside Boston, Massachusetts. Bridge Nine is owned by Chris Wrenn of Salem, Massachusetts, who began the label in 1995 and produced its first release in 1996. The label is named as a metaphor for what Wrenn wanted to do in creating the label: bridge all parts of the hardcore scene into one label and then put his lucky number (nine) in the title. The label currently has 8 employees and 30 active bands.

In 2021, the label announced they were opening a record store.

Active Bridge Nine bands 

Advent
After the Fall
Agnostic Front
Alcoa
Alpha & Omega
Ambitions
American Nightmare
American War Machine
Anger Regiment
Antidote
Backtrack
Beach Rats
Bent Life
Betrayed
Blue Monday
BoySetsFire
Breaker Breaker
Breathe In
Burn
Candy Hearts
Carry On
Crime in Stereo
Cross Me
Crown of Thornz
Dead Ending
Dead Swans
Death Before Dishonor
DYS
Expire
Gallows
H2O
Lemuria
Malfunction
Modern Pain
Moral Mazes
Mother of Mercy
Nervous Impulse
Octaves
R.A. (Rude Awakening)
Soul Control
Strike Anywhere
True Love (MI)
Underdog
War On Women

Previous and affiliated Bridge 9 artists 

Agnostic Front
The Alligators
Betrayed
Blue Monday
Breaker Breaker
Breathe In
Carry On
Ceremony
Champion
Cops and Robbers
Cruel Hand
Death Threat
Defeater
The Distance
Energy
For the Worse
Foundation
American Nightmare
Goodtime Boys
Have Heart
Hierophant
Holding On
The Hope Conspiracy
International Superheroes of Hardcore
Iron Chic
Mental
Miles Away
New Found Glory
No Turning Back
No Warning
Over My Dead Body
On the Rise
Outbreak
Paint It Black
Palehorse
Panic
Polar Bear Club
Proclamation
Project X (2005 reissue)
Ramallah
Reaching Forward
Right Brigade
Ruiner
Sick of It All
Silver Snakes
Sinners and Saints
Slapshot
Some Kind of Hate
Stand and Fight
Striking Distance
Sworn In
Ten Yard Fight
Test of Time
Terror
Think I Care
Triple Threat
The Trouble
Verse
Violent Sons
Wrecking Crew

Releases

References

External links 
 Official website
 Stuff Magazine review of the Ruiner, Prepare to Be Let Down album
 Interview with Chris Wrenn of B9 on PMAKid.com

 
American record labels
Record labels established in 1995
Hardcore record labels